Anthony Hudson may refer to:

Anthony Hudson (commentator) (born 1971), Australian sports commentator
Anthony Hudson (soccer) (born 1981), English-American association football manager
Tony Hudson (born 1958), American college and minor league baseball pitcher